Lotus herbaceus is a herbaceous perennial plant belonging to the genus Lotus of the family Fabaceae. The species includes the plants formerly called Dorycnium herbaceum and Dorycnium jordanii. The flowering period extends from May through July.

Subspecies
Two subspecies are recognized:
 Lotus herbaceus subsp. gracilis (Jord.) Jauzein; synonyms include Dorycnium jordanii Loret & Barrandon – coast of the western Mediterranean, both Europe and Africa
 Lotus herbaceus subsp. herbaceus; synonyms include Dorycnium herbaceum Vill. – southern and eastern Europe through Turkey to the Caucasus

Distribution
Lotus herbaceus can be found in southern and eastern Europe through Turkey to the Caucasus. It also extends into northern Africa.

References 

 Pignatti S. - Flora d'Italia - Edagricole – 1982

External links 

herbaceus
Flora of Europe
Flora of Western Asia
Flora of the Caucasus